Leviev (Bulgarian or Russian: Левиев) is a Slavic masculine surname, its feminine counterpart is Levieva. It is a Russification of the Jewish surname "Levi." It may refer to
Lev Avnerovich Leviev, (born 1956), Bukharian Jewish businessman
Lev Binzumovich Leviev, (born 1984), Russian–Israeli Internet entrepreneur and investor
Simon Leviev (born 1990), Israeli conman
Margarita Levieva (born 1980), Russian-American actress
Milcho Leviev (born 1937), Bulgarian Jewish composer, arranger and jazz performer
Yoan Leviev (1934–1994), Bulgarian artist 

Russian-language surnames
Russian-Jewish surnames